This is a list of election results for the electoral district of Pirie in South Australian elections.

Members for Pirie

Election results

Elections in the 1970s

References

South Australian state electoral results by district